Kamakura is a city in Kanagawa Prefecture, Japan.

Named after the city are:

Kamakura period (c.1192–1333), a period in the history of Japan
Kamakura shogunate (1192–1333), the shōgun government of the period
Kamakura (snow dome), festive Japanese snowdomes
Kamakura (G.I. Joe), a character in the G.I. Joe universe
Kamakura Corporation, a U.S. financial risk software company
Kamakura (EP), an EP by Gang Gang Dance

See also
 Kamacuras, a fictional gigantic praying mantis in the Godzilla film series
 Izuru Kamukura, the mastermind behind "The Tragedy" in the Japanese media franchise Danganronpa